The Compagnie des chemins économiques de l’Est égyptien (French for Economic Railway Company of the Egyptian East) built and briefly operated a  long  gauge railway network around Damanhour and Tanta in Egypt. § 51

History 

The Compagnie des chemins économiques de l’Est égyptien was founded on 19 May 1897 by the Belgian aristocrat Édouard Empain (born 1852; died 1929) as a PLC.  § 34 The French business bank Paribas was not one of the co-founders, but got involved by replacing the group of German investors, who had teamed-up with the Empain Group and three local banks on previous occasions. The concession was given to the banks of the Suarès brothers, Félix de Menasce, Cattaui and Wilhelm Pelizaeus. They divided the fully paid-in capital of 200,000 Pound Sterling (5,040,000 French Franc) in shares of 55, 20, 15 und 10%, respectively. § 50

The Egyptian government granted the concession for 70 years, after which the railway had to be handed over to the State. It guaranteed for the investors a net income of 900 F/km. Half of the total income of 5,625 F per year and kilometre was due to be given to the government. The Paribas bank signed for a quarter of the capital, which was shared amongst the founders proportionally and elected a Member of the Board.  § 51

The railway company issued 12,500 stock exchange certificates at 3.5% of the total capital, i.e. 20 GBP (504 F) each, to be paid back within 70 years. The Paribas bank purchased shares at the value of 446.25 F and re-sold them at the same price to the public withholding a 4% premium. From a political point of view, this was one of the best concessions of Lower-Egypt and increased the French influence onto the region. The guaranteed annual net income of 315,000 F for the 350 km of railway track, promised to provide a profitable margin in comparison to the 242,304 F investment.  § 52 The results exceeded the most optimistic prognoses of the founders, which led to an increase of capital to 8,125,000 F in March 1900. The new 100 F shares were issued at 106,25 F, to gain 3,320,300 F. A quarter of the first and second tranche of the shares and all loans were sold in France at a total of 7,674,141 F.  § 53

The company merged with Egyptian Delta Light Railways Company in April 1900 by exchanging shares. The Paribas bank left the company and was not affiliated to the Egyptian Delta Light Railways.  § 54

Lines and stations

100. Damanhour — Tod — Teh-el-Baroud

101. Tod — Delingat

102. Damanhour — Kafr-el-Dawar

103. Damanhour — Shibrikhit — Teh-el-Barud Ville

104. Shibrikhit — Miniet Salamah

105. Tel-el-Barud — Kafr Awana

106. Damanhour — Edfina

107. Tanta — Sidi-Salem

108. Bassioun Régulateur — Fua

109. Mehallet Malek — El-Asiefar

110. Birmah — Kafr-el-Zaya

111. Tanta — Baltim

112. Tira — Talkha

113. Sakha — Mehalla-Kebir

114. Kafr Sarem — Birket-el-Sab

115. Barrage — Mansura

116. Beltan — Kafr-Hamza

117. Sahragt — Zagazig

118. Mit-Abu-Kha1ed — Bilbeis — Abu-Hammad

118A. El—Zaoura — Burdein

119. Mit-Ghamr — Abu-Hammad

120. Ibrahamia Sharkia — Hehia

121. Mit-Ghamr — Simbellawin

122. Mit-Samanud — Zagazig

References 

Metre gauge railways in Egypt
Railway lines in Egypt